Winston Lake may refer to:

 Winston Lake (Kenora District), Northwestern Ontario, Canada
 Winston Lake (Thunder Bay District), Ontario, Canada